Melitta melanura is a species of Melitta.

The species was described in 1852 by Nylander as Kirbya melanura.

It is found in Eurasia.

Synonyms:
 Kirbya melanura Nylander, 1852
 Melitta wankowiczi (Radoszkowski, 1891)

References

Melittidae